William Bartholomew, was an English first-class cricketer.

The son of Charles Bartholomew, a prominent Chertsey cricketer, Bartholomew made his debut in first-class cricket for a Surrey side against a Kent XI at Bishopsbourne in 1773, with him making a further appearance for Surrey in 1773 against a Hampshire XI at Hambledon. His next appearance in first-class cricket came five years later in 1778, when he played for Chertsey against England at Laleham Burway. Over a decade later, in 1789, he appeared in a fourth first-class match for the Gentlemen of England against Middlesex at Marylebone. He scored 59 runs in his four matches, with a highest score of 30.

References

External links

Year of birth unknown
Year of death unknown
English cricketers
Surrey cricketers
Chertsey cricketers
Gentlemen of England cricketers